Ahmet C. Bozer (born 1960) is a Turkish business executive. He is executive vice president and president of Coca-Cola International, which consists of The Coca-Cola Company's Asia Pacific, Europe, Eurasia & Africa, and Latin America operations.

Early years
Bozer was born to Ali Bozer, an academic of Commercial Law and politician, 1960 in Istanbul, Turkey. He finished TED Ankara Koleji and studied Business Administration at the Middle East Technical University in Ankara. Later, he earned a MBA degree in Business Information Systems from Georgia State University.

Career
After beginning as a consultant and instructor, Bozer was employed by Coopers and Lybrand, where he had various roles in audit, consultancy and management in the five years there.

In 1990, he joined Coca-Cola USA as Financial Control Manager at the company's headquarters in Atlanta, Georgia. Bozer was appointed Region Finance Manager at the Turkish Enterprise in 1992.

He was Finance Director and Deputy Managing Director of The Coca-Cola Company Bottling Operations in Turkey from 1994 to 1999. After serving as the Managing Director of Coca-Cola Bottlers of Turkey (CCBT), Bozer became the President of Eurasia & Middle East Division based in Istanbul, Turkey on January 1, 2006. On July 1, 2007, he was appointed President of the Eurasia and Africa Group, which comprises a total of more than 90 countries, and served until December 31, 2012. In 2013, he became Executive Vice President and President of Coca-Cola International.

References

1960 births
Businesspeople from Istanbul
TED Ankara College Foundation Schools alumni
Middle East Technical University alumni
University of Georgia alumni
PricewaterhouseCoopers
Directors of The Coca-Cola Company
Turkish chief executives
Coca-Cola people
Turkish expatriates in the United States
Living people
20th-century American businesspeople